Uchaʼan Kʼan Bʼalam was a Maya king of Aguateca, father and predecessor of Tan Teʼ Kʼinich.

Aguateca Stela 19 records a battle that his son fought and also gives the name of Uchaʼan Kʼan Bʼalam.

Notes
Tan Teʼ Kʼinich

Kings of Aguateca
Year of birth unknown
Year of death unknown